E. P. Sreekumar is an Indian short story writer and novelist in Malayalam. He received the Kerala Sahitya Akademi Award for Story in 2010 for his collection Parasya Sareeram. He is also a recipient of Abu Dhabi Sakthi Award, C. V. Sreeraman Award and Ulloor Award.

Biography
Sreekumar was born in Pallipuram near Cherai in Ernakulam district, Kerala. He worked for 35 years at the People's Urban Cooperative Bank in Tripunithura and retired as its General Manager in 2014. He published a science fiction novel titled Maramudra in 2002 which a prize in a competition held as part of the golden jubilee of Current Books. His other works include the short story collections Parasya Sareeram, Currency and Adhwanavetta, and the novels Mamsapporu and Dravyam.

Awards
Sreekumar is a recipient of several awards including:
 Kerala Sahitya Akademi Award for Story in 2011 for Parasya Sareeram
 Abu Dhabi Sakthi Award in 2015 for Currency
 K. R. Manoraj Award in 2015 for Currency
 C. V. Sreeraman Award in 2018 for Adhwanavetta
 Ulloor Award in 2019 for Adhwanavetta
 Current Books Golden Jubilee Novel Award for Maramudra
 T. V. Kochubava Award
 S. K. Pottekkatt Award
 SBT Literary Award

Works

Short story collections
 Parasya Sareeram (DC Books, 2008)
 Currency (Mathrubhumi Books, 2014)
 Kanneerppasu (Logos Books, 2017)
 Adhwanavetta (DC Books, 2017)
 Khalasi (DC Books, 2022)

Novels
 Maramudra (Current Books, 2002)
 Mamsapporu (DC Books, 2013)
 Dravyam (DC Books, 2021)

References

External links
 "കണ്ണീർപ്പശു" [Kanneerppasu] (Full text of the short story) at Puzha.com
 "ഖലാസി" [Khalasi]  (Full text of the short story) at Samakalika Malayalam Vaarika

Further reading
 

Malayalam novelists
Malayalam-language writers
Writers from Kochi
Indian male novelists
Indian male short story writers
Living people
20th-century Indian short story writers
20th-century Indian novelists
21st-century Indian novelists
21st-century Indian short story writers
Novelists from Kerala
20th-century Indian male writers
21st-century Indian male writers
Recipients of the Kerala Sahitya Akademi Award
Recipients of the Abu Dhabi Sakthi Award
Year of birth missing (living people)